Suteibey is a village in Anggi district, Pegunungan Arfak Regency in West Papua province, Indonesia. Its population is 204.

Climate
Suteibey has a subtropical highland climate (Cfb) with heavy rainfall year-round.

References

 Populated places in West Papua